Andreas Aigner (born 24 September 1984 in Leoben) is an Austrian rally driver. He won the Production World Rally Championship (PWRC) in the 2008 season.

Career

Aigner made his World Rally Championship debut in 2005, finishing 19th on the Cyprus Rally driving a Mitsubishi Lancer Evolution VIII. He competed in three further WRC events that year. For 2006 he signed for Armin Schwarz's Red Bull Škoda team, with Harri Rovanperä as teammate, driving a Škoda Fabia on ten WRC rounds. He scored his first WRC points on Rallye Deutschland, with a sixth-place finish.

In 2007 he began competing in the Production World Rally Championship (PWRC), finishing 13th in the standings, driving a Red Bull-backed Mitsubishi Lancer Evolution IX. In 2008 he won the PWRC class on Rally Argentina (where he finished eighth overall), Acropolis Rally and Rally of Turkey, winning the PWRC crown.

In 2012 he competed in the Super 2000 World Rally Championship (S-WRC).

Career results

Complete WRC results

PWRC results

S-WRC results

IRC results

European Rally Championship results

References

External links 
 

1984 births
Austrian rally drivers
World Rally Championship drivers
Living people
Intercontinental Rally Challenge drivers
European Rally Championship drivers
Škoda Motorsport drivers